President Biden will make many nominations to key roles in the Department of Justice, including the attorney general, deputy attorney general, and solicitor general. As with all other nominations, almost all of them have to be confirmed by the United States Senate before they can start their service.

Below is a list of nominations and appointments to the Department of Justice by Joe Biden, the 46th president of the United States. , according to tracking by The Washington Post and Partnership for Public Service, 16 nominees have been confirmed, 3 nominees are being considered by the Senate, 6 positions do not have nominees, 5 appointments have been made to positions that don't require confirmation, and 1 position does not have an appointee.

Color key 
 Denotes appointees awaiting Senate confirmation.

 Denotes appointees serving in an acting capacity.

 Denotes appointees who have left office or offices which have been disbanded.

Leadership

Divisions

Offices

Federal agencies

Other offices and agencies

Commissions

Withdrawn nominations

See also 
 List of federal judges appointed by Joe Biden
 Joe Biden Supreme Court candidates
 Cabinet of Joe Biden, for the vetting process undergone by top-level roles including advice and consent by the Senate
 List of executive branch 'czars' e.g. Special Advisor to the President

Notes 

Confirmations by roll call vote

Confirmations by voice vote

References 

 Biden
Justice